Shuanglianpi Wetland is a partially protected natural area in Yilan County in northern Taiwan. Situated 470 meters above sea-level, it contains a botanically rich, shallow lake, which, from the perspective of plant species density, is considered to be a wetland with global significance by the Forestry Bureau of Taiwan. 

At Shuanglianpi, 17.16 hectares of water surface and shorezone fringe are designated as a Wildlife Refuge by Taiwan.

Biodiversity

Flora 
Shuanglianpi displays over one third of Taiwan's native aquatic plant diversity with 112 species. These contribute to the currently observed total of 321 vascular plant taxa in the wetland area, which are distributed among 105 families. 

Threatened species according to the Taiwan Red List of Vascular Plants include Salix kusanoi (endangered), Pogostemon stellatus (endangered), Limnophila trichophylla (endangered), Eleocharis ochrostachys (endangered) Utricularia aurea (endangered), Brasenia schreberi (vulnerable), and Cyperus platystylis (vulnerable). Of these, Salix kusanoi is particularly noteworthy as it is endemic to Taiwan and known from only two locations. In addition, Shuanglianpi is also the only known place where Trapa bispinosa can be seen in Taiwan.

Floating floral mats formed by emergent vegetation and humus that drift according to the direction of the wind are another feature of Shuanglianpi. The only examples of this precise phenomenon in Taiwan, these "floating islands" mediate light entering the water and contribute both to species richness and improved water quality.

Fauna 
58 dragonfly species have been recorded at Shuanglianpi, where an additional 32 other kinds of aquatic insect are also found. Some are endemic either to Taiwan or the wider region. They join 206 insect taxa in the surrounding terrestrial habitats.

Sources vary on the diversity of birdlife with the number of species placed between 39. and over 70 Some are again unique to Taiwan, including the Taiwan blue magpie (Urocissa caerulea), Taiwan scimitar babbler (Pomatorhinus musicus), black-necklaced scimitar babbler (Pomatorhinus erythrocnemis), Taiwan yuhina (Yuhina brunneiceps), Taiwan whistling thrush (Myophonus insularis) and Taiwan barbet (Psilopogon nuchalis). The long-tailed shrike (Lanius schach), Mandarin duck (Aix galericulata), and common teal (Anas crecca), which are threatened on the Taiwan Red List of Birds, are all reported.

Shuanglianpi herpetofauna contains records of approximately 18 reptile and 19 amphibian species. In the latter category, the central Formosa toad (Bufo bankorensis), temple tree frog (Kurixalus idiootocus), Nantou flying frog (Zhangixalus moltrechti), tributary flying frog (Zhangixalus prasinatus), bangkimtsing frog (Odorrana swinhoana), long-legged brown frog (Rana longicrus) and Taipei flying frog (Zhangixalus taipeianus) can only be found in Taiwan. This limit to global geographic range also applies to at least two reptiles: the Formosa grass lizard (Takydromus formosanus) and the Formosa slug snake (Pareas formosensis). 

From all herpetofauna, various taxa are threatened with extinction according to IUCN evaluations: the Taipei flying frog (vulnerable at the national level), long-legged brown frog (vulnerable globally), and Chinese softshell turtle (Pelodiscus sinensis, vulnerable globally).

At least 16 fish species are represented at Shuanglianpi as well. These include the rosy bitterling (Rhodeus ocellatus), which is thought to have been originally endemic to Taiwan; the Taiwan Venus fish (Aphyocypris kikuchii), which is both endemic to Taiwan and endangered; the river loach (Formosania lacustre), another endemic species; and the Japanese rice fish (Oryzias latipes), which is vulnerable to extinction at the national level. 

Other species categories such as mammals require further research.

Threats 
The ecosystem at Shuanglianpi is threatened by invasive species and agriculture in the surrounding area, although rural depopulation might be reducing pressure from farming. Eutrophication and hydrological interventions are additional threats, among various human disturbances over the years. A nearby road may be an obstacle to the water flow too.

Management 
Goals of the Shuanglianpi Wildlife Refuge cover conservation of lowland Machilus-Castanopsis sub-montane evergreen broadleaved forest habitat; maintenance of precious and unique genetic diversity in Taiwan; establishment of resources and trained personnel for public communication; revitalization of habitats for the fish species Oryzias latipes, the tributary flying frog (Zhangixalus prasinatus), whose entire global range is confined to northern Taiwan, and endangered taxa; guaranteeing the ecological integrity of succession processes; conservation of biological diversity; and delivering the conditions for sustainable community development via green economic practices.

A Taiwanese non-governmental organisation called the Society of Wilderness contributes to the day-to-day management of the Shuanglianpi Wildlife Refuge. Since 2010, it has collaborated with Wistron, the publicly listed electronics manufacturer, which supports conservation, habitat revitalization, and education via the Wistron Foundation. Some additional financial support for the protected area is also supplied by the local government.

References 

Protected areas of Taiwan
Landforms of Yilan County, Taiwan